One for the Road is an album by singers and songwriters Willie Nelson and Leon Russell, produced by the pair. The album was first released as a double vinyl LP by Columbia Records. The album was recorded in Leon's new facility, Paradise Studios in Burbank, California. The album peaked at No. 25 on the US Billboard 200 chart, No. 3 on US country albums chart, No. 28 on the Canada albums chart, No. 1 on the Canada country albums chart and No. 11 on the New Zealand albums chart. The album has gold certification for sales of over 500,000 albums in the US and Canada .

It was re-released on CD in 1989, 2008 and 2017. The new releases were after Leon recordings earned six gold records. He received two Grammy awards from seven nominations. In 2011, Leon was inducted into both the Rock and Roll Hall of Fame and the Songwriters Hall of Fame. One of his biggest early fans, Elton John, said Russell was a "mentor" and an "inspiration". They recorded their album The Union in 2010, which earned them a Grammy nomination.

Track listing

 "Detour" (Paul Westmoreland) -    2:24
 "I Saw The Light"     (Hank Williams) -    3:04
 "Heartbreak Hotel"    (Mae Boren Axton, Tommy Durden, Elvis Presley) -    3:00
 "Let The Rest Of The World Go By"     (Ernest Ball, J. Keirn Brennan) -    3:46
 "Trouble in Mind"   (Richard M. Jones)    -     2:40
 "Don't Fence Me In "    (Cole Porter) -     2:25
 "The Wild Side of Life"  (Arlie Carter, William Warren) -     3:21
 "Ridin' Down the Canyon"     (Gene Autry, Smiley Burnette) -     3:20
 "Sioux City Sue" (Dick Thomas, Ray Freedman) -     3:15
 "You Are My Sunshine" (Charles Mitchell, Jimmie Davis) -     2:49
 "Danny Boy"     (Frederic Weatherly) -    3:58
 "Always"      (Irving Berlin) -    2:16
 "Summertime"    (Dudley Heyward, George Gershwin) -     2:27
 "Because Of You"     (Dudly Wilkinson) -    2:04
 "Am I Blue?"     (Grant Clarke, Harry Akst) -     2:16
 "Tenderly"     (Jack Lawrence, Walter Gross) -    3:58
 "Far Away Places"     (Alex Kramer, Joan Whitney Kramer) -      3:08
 "That Lucky Old Sun"     (Beasley Smith, Haven Gillespie) -    2:38
 "Stormy Weather"   (Harold Arlen, Ted Koehler) -    2:35
 "One for My Baby (and One More for the Road)"   (Harold  Arlen, Johnny Mercer) -    2:32

Charts

Personnel
Leon Russell 	Guitar, Keyboards, Performer, Piano, Primary Artist, Producer, Vocals
Willie Nelson 	Guitar, Performer, Primary Artist, Producer, Vocals
Jim Boatman 	Vocals (Background)
Ambrose Campbell 	Percussion
Paul English 	Drums
Chris Ethridge 	Bass
John Gallie 	Organ
Marty Grebb 	Saxophone
Rex Ludwick 	Drums
Maria Muldaur 	Guest Artist, Vocals (Background)
Jody Payne 	Guitar, Vocals (Background)
Bonnie Raitt 	Guest Artist, Slide Guitar
Mickey Raphael 	Guest Artist, Harmonica
Bernie Grundman 	Engineer

Further reading 
 The Encyclopedia of Country Music, ed. Paul Kingsbury, pp. 374–76 "Willie Nelson", Bob Allen, New York: Oxford University Press, 1998.
 Nelson, Susie (1987). Hear Worn Memories: a Daughter's Personal Biography of Willie Nelson. First ed. Eakin Press. .

External links
 Leon Russell
Leon Russell discography
Leon Russell lyrics
Leon Russell Records
Leon Russell NAMM Oral History Program Interview (2012)

  Willie Nelson
 [ Willie Nelson] at AllMusic

References

1979 albums
Willie Nelson albums
Leon Russell albums
Collaborative albums
Columbia Records albums